Richard Martin Fearon (born 30 July 1991) is an English former cricketer. Fearon played as a right-handed batsman who bowled right-arm off break. He was born in South Shields, County Durham.

Having appeared once for the Durham Second XI in 2009, Fearon proceeded to make a single appearance for Northumberland in the 2010 Minor Counties Championship against Norfolk.  While studying Automotive Materials Engineering at Loughborough University, Fearon made his first-class debut for Loughborough MCCU against Kent.  In Loughborough's first-innings, he was dismissed for a duck by Neil Saker, while in their second-innings he was dismissed by Adam Riley.  This is his only first-class match to date.

References

External links

1991 births
Living people
Cricketers from South Shields
English cricketers
Northumberland cricketers
Loughborough MCCU cricketers